Purley is an area of the London Borough of Croydon in London, England,  south of Charing Cross, with a history going back at least 800 years. It was originally granted as an estate from holdings at Sanderstead and until as a district of Surrey and then, with neighbouring Coulsdon, as an urban district that became an electoral ward of the London Borough of Croydon, becoming part of the ceremonial county of London, in 1965. In 2018 the Purley ward was divided into two: Purley and Woodcote, and Purley Oaks and Riddlesdown.

Purley is a suburban area of South London, and the quintessential suburban environment has been referenced in fictional and popular culture, most notably as the setting for the long running Terry and June sitcom.

Purley had a population of about 14,000 in 2011.

History

Toponymy
The name derives from an estate, mentioned in about 1200 when it was deeded to one William de Pirelea, son of Osbert de Pirelea by the abbot of St. Peter’s monastery near Winchester.

Local government
Under the Local Government Act 1894, Purley became part of the Croydon Rural District of Surrey. In 1915 Purley and the neighbouring town of Coulsdon formed the Coulsdon and Purley Urban District which was based at the Purley Council Offices. The council was abolished in 1965, under the London Government Act 1963, and its area transferred to Greater London and used to form part of the London Borough of Croydon.

The urban district council was based in a colonial-style building opened in 1930. The building, on the A23 Brighton Road near Reedham Station, became the property of the London Borough of Croydon and was sold to developers. It was left derelict for many years but was converted into flats in 2012. Plans to dig under the building and build additional flats were refused in 2015.

Aviation
Kenley Aerodrome, to the east of the town, is currently official property of the Ministry of Defence. It was one of the key fighter stations – together with Croydon Airport and Biggin Hill – during the World War II support of Dunkirk, Battle of Britain and for the defence of London.

Suburban growth

Purley grew rapidly in the 1920s and 1930s, providing spacious homes in a green environment. Northeast Purley stretches into the chalk hill spurs of the North Downs.

One road, Promenade de Verdun, created by William Webb, has a distinction all of its own. It is 600 yards (550 m) long and has on one side Lombardy poplars planted in local soil mixed with French earth specially shipped over to the UK. A plaque at one end of the road explains that the French ministry of the interior donated the soil from Armentières, as a memorial to the alliance of World War One and the soldiers who died. At the other end stands an obelisk carved from a single piece of stone with the inscription "Aux soldats de France morts glorieusement pendant la Grande Guerre".

The 32nd Surrey Battalion of the Home Guard was known as the Factory Battalion, and had the specific task of guarding the Purley Way factories: its units were mainly based on staff from the individual firms. The factories adjoining Croydon Airport took the worst of the air raid of 15 August 1940: the British NSF factory was almost entirely destroyed, and the Bourjois factory gutted, with a total of over sixty civilian deaths.

A comprehensive history of Purley and its growth around Caterham Junction (now Purley Station) with the coming of the railways some 150 years ago is found in the Bourne Society's 'Purley Village History' and in its Local History Records publications.

The Webb Estate made headlines in a 2002 survey, which found that it had over the years attracted the highest-earning residents in the UK. In the same year Purley topped Britain's rich list becoming the most affluent suburb and consistently features among the most affluent suburbs in Britain owing to its exclusive gated estates, large houses and greenery yet only less than 30 minutes from central London thus attracting wealthy city workers.

Geography 

The Purley postal district encompasses Purley high street and extends through Woodcote to the West, includes the Peaks Hill area to the North, and borders Purley Oaks in South Croydon. To the East it includes Riddlesdown and to the South it borders Kenley and Coulsdon. The current electoral ward of Purley and Woodcote is largely co-extensive with the postal district, but Riddlesdown is now in the neighbouring Purley Oaks and Riddlesdown ward.

Woodcote is contained within Purley. Developed in the early 20th century, it is centred on Woodcote Village Green and is the location of Woodcote Model Village. Purley's Webb Estate lies on Woodcote road, close to Upper Woodcote Village.

The Bourne river runs through Purley. The river is culverted but can flood in Purley valley. A local history society take their name from this river.

Education

Purley is home to a number of schools; including four Catholic schools.  Two of which are in Peaks Hill neighbourhood of Purley, and these are The John Fisher School an all boys state school (formerly an independent and then a voluntary aided state school), and Laleham Lea School a co-educational prep-school.

Purley has one of the UK's longest-established language schools, Purley Language College, founded in 1928.

The current schools in Purley are:

{| class="wikitable sortable unsortable" style=" border:solid 1px #999999; margin:0 0 1em 1em;" 
|+Current Purley Schools
|-
!Name
!Type
!Mix
!Status
!Enrollment
|-
|Beaumont Primary School
|Primary
|Mixed
|LEA
|128
|-
|Christ Church Cofe Primary School
|Primary 
|Mixed
|C of E
|214
|-
|Cumnor House School for Girls
|Primary
|Girls
|Independent
|118
|-
|Laleham Lea School
|Primary
|Mixed
|Catholic Independent
|147
|-
|Margaret Roper Catholic Primary School
|Primary
|Mixed
|Catholic
|219
|-
|Oakwood School
|Primary/Prep
|Mixed
|Catholic Independent
|219
|-
|Reedham Park School Limited
|Primary
|Mixed
|Independent
|113
|-
|Riddlesdown Collegiate
|Secondary
|Mixed
|LEA
|1517
|-
|St David's School
|Primary/Prep
|Mixed
|Independent
|167
|-
|St Nicholas School
|Primary
|Mixed
|LEA/Special
|103
|-
|The John Fisher School
|Secondary
|Boys
|Catholic
|1004
|-
|Thomas More Catholic School
|Secondary
|Mixed
|Catholic
|717
|-
|Tudor Lodge School
|Mixed
|Mixed
|Independent
|8
|-
|Wattenden Primary School
|Primary
|Mixed
|LEA
|139
|-
|West Dene School
|Primary
|Mixed
|Independent
|107
|}

Retail and commerce

Purley used to have many different kinds of shops such as greengrocers, butchers, toy shops, tobacconists, a restaurant and a cinema. There was an earlier Sainsbury's store that closed in the 1980s, when a new  Sainsbury's was opened at Purley Fountain. The new Sainsbury's closed in 2001. A Tesco superstore was opened in 1991, and  there has been a shift in the town's retail offering towards charity shops, restaurants and non retail businesses.

Purley retail and commerce interests are represented by the Purley Business improvement district. This Business Improvement District (BID) is in the second 5-year term having successfully been voted in favour in 2015 and 2020.

The island opposite Purley Baptist Church has been refurbished and the Church, under the banner of 58:12 (a company and charity set up by the Church) are planning to redevelop it. Other partners in the development of a strategy for the regeneration of central Purley include the Purely Business improvement district, the Purley & Woodcote Residents' Association and Purley Rotary who actively participate in the Neighbourhood Partnership forums hosted by Croydon Council.

Demography
In the 2011 census, Purley had a population of 14607 with a demography of: White or White British (68.2%), Asian or Asian British (15.5%), Black or Black British (8.2%), Mixed/multiple ethnic groups (5.8%), and  Other ethnic group (1.7%). White British is the largest single ethnicity (60.7%).

Politics

Purley lies within the Croydon South parliamentary constituency, where voters have consistently returned Conservative Party MPs to the local seat since 1974. Purley has been staunchly conservative and its amalgamation into the London borough of Croydon in 1965 helped consolidate the middle class domination of that borough. The Purley electoral ward returned Conservative party councillors in Croydon London Borough Council elections from 1965 up until the reorganisation of 2018.  In 2018, Purley was split into two wards; Purley and Woodcote, and Purley Oaks and Riddlesdown.

Fictional references

On television the town became known in the sitcom, Terry and June where Terry and June Medford (Terry Scott and June Whitfield), had moved after the characters' previous series, Happy Ever After. The sitcom was set on the cusp of Purley and Wallington (on Church Road in a house within sight of St Mark's Church) and the opening credits featured them searching for each other around the (now unrecognisable) Whitgift Centre – a shopping precinct in Croydon.
One of the houses used in Footballer's Wives is 7 Rose Walk, Purley, owned by former Crystal Palace FC Chairman Ron Noades.
The CBBC children's sitcom Little Howard's Big Question is based in Purley, and also features continuous references to Croydon.
Mr Angry, a character on Steve Wright's Radio 1 afternoon show in the 1980s, is from Purley.

Notable residents
 Michael Arthur, Vice-Chancellor of Leeds University, Provost of University College London from September 2013, was born in Purley.
 Jay Aston, singer with Bucks Fizz, was born in Purley.
 Ronald Binge and his wife Vera lived at 18, Smitham Bottom Lane in the 1950s. He composed the well-known Elizabethan Serenade there. 
Derren Brown, magician and mentalist, was born and grew up in Purley.
Kit Connor, actor, was raised in Purley.
Peter Cushing OBE, actor, was born in nearby Kenley, and went to school in Purley.
 Brian Fahey, composer of "At the Sign of the Swingin' Cymbal" (the signature tune to BBC Radio's Pick of the Pops).
Andy Frampton, former professional footballer, grew up in Purley.
Shelagh Fraser, actress, was born in Purley 
Laura Hamilton, TV presenter and Dancing on Ice Contestant, lives in Purley.
Nigel Harman, actor, was born in Purley.
Sir Bernard Ingham, Margaret Thatcher's former press secretary, lives in Purley.
Sir David P. Lane, oncologist best known for identifying P53, went to John Fisher school in Purley.
Martin Lee, singer with Brotherhood of Man, was born in Purley.
Archibald Low, pioneer of radio guidance systems, was born in Purley.
Ray Mears, TV survivalist, went to school in Purley.
Ron Noades, former chairman of Wimbledon FC, Crystal Palace FC and Brentford FC and owner of the Altonwood Golf Group, lived in Rose Walk, Purley, from 1993 until 2013.
Innes Hope Pearse, doctor and co-founder of the Peckham Experiment, grew up in Purley.
Francis Rossi, lead singer of Status Quo, lives in the Webb Estate in Purley.
John Horne Tooke, an English politician and philologist, lived in Purley at the end of the 18th century where he began writing Epea Pteroenta, Or, The Diversions of Purley.
Wilfried Zaha, footballer, Crystal Palace FC, lives in the Webb Estate.

Transport

Purley Cross gyratory connects routes leading south-east to East Grinstead and Eastbourne (the A22), west to Epsom and Kingston (the A2022), south to Redhill and Brighton (the A23), and north to Croydon and Central London (the A23 and A235). The A23 north from Purley forms the Purley Way, which leads to Croydon's trading and industrial hinterland and also to the former Croydon Airport, the predecessor of the present London Heathrow Airport and London Gatwick Airport.

The town is on the main London-to-Brighton railway line and is served by Purley and Purley Oaks stations on that line, and Reedham station on the Tattenham Corner Line.

Nearest railway stations
Purley railway station
Purley Oaks railway station
Riddlesdown railway station
Reedham railway station
Sanderstead railway station

Nearest places

Coulsdon
Croydon
Kenley
Riddlesdown
South Croydon
Selsdon
Sanderstead
Warlingham
Woldingham
Banstead

See also
 The John Fisher School
 St. David's School
 Commonweal Lodge
 Purley Language College
 Purley Business Association

References

External links
 Purley Business Improvement District
 Purley Business Association
 Purley Business Expo
 Purley Festival
 Local Gov. Site Promenade de Verdun
History of Purley Village
PWRA, Purley & Woodcote Residents' Association
The Bourne Society, representing heritage interests in the debate over Purley regeneration

Districts of the London Borough of Croydon
Areas of London
District centres of London